Joe Maiden (1941 – 17 September 2015) was a gardener, horticulturist, author and BBC Radio presenter based in Huby, Yorkshire, England.

Career 
Maiden was brought up in Penrith, Cumbria, and was educated at Askham Bryan College.

A professional horticulturist over a period spanning 40 years, he appeared on numerous gardening programmes for the BBC and Yorkshire Television and was awarded the Harlow Carr medal by The Royal Horticultural Society for his growing, lecturing and exhibitions of vegetables. Maiden's work has been published in a number of audio visual presentations He was a Fellow of the National Vegetable Society, and served on the society's judging panel.  He was a committee member of the Leeds Horticultural Society.

Alongside the long-standing BBC Radio Leeds presenter Tim Crowther, Maiden regularly presented to Sunday morning audiences to the station's weekly peak audience.

He died on 17 September 2015 of prostate cancer.

Bibliography

References 

BBC radio presenters
Deaths from prostate cancer
English horticulturists
2015 deaths
People from Penrith, Cumbria
1941 births